Migennes is a commune in the Yonne department in Bourgogne-Franche-Comté in north-central France. Laroche-Migennes station has rail connections to Dijon, Paris, Auxerre, Corbigny and Avallon.

Population

Town partnership
  Simmern, Rhineland-Palatinate, Germany

See also
 Canal de Bourgogne
 Communes of the Yonne department

References

Communes of Yonne